The 2017 Cavan Senior Football Championship is the 109th edition of Cavan GAA's premier gaelic football tournament for senior graded clubs in County Cavan, Ireland. The tournament consists of 14 teams, with the winner representing Cavan in the Ulster Senior Club Football Championship.

The championship starts with a league stage and then progresses to a knock out stage. The draw for the group stages of the championship were made on 10 April 2017.

Ramor United were the defending champions after they defeated neighbours Castlerahan in the previous years final, however Castlerahan exacted their revenge when dethroning them at the semi-final stage.

Cavan Gaels regained their throne as Cavan kingpins, defeating Castlerahan by 0-13 to 0-8 in the final. This was their 14th win, and also their 10th in 20 years.

Team Changes
The following teams have changed division since the 2016 championship season.

To S.F.C.
Promoted from 2016 Cavan Intermediate Football Championship
  Arva  -  (Intermediate Champions)

From S.F.C.
Relegated to 2017 Cavan Intermediate Football Championship
  Ballyhaise
  Denn
  Killeshandra

League stage
All 14 teams enter the competition at this stage. A random draw determines which teams face each other in each of the four rounds. No team can meet each other twice in the group stage. The top 8 teams go into a random unseeded draw for the quarter-finals while the bottom 6 teams will enter a Relegation Playoff. If teams are level on points and a place in the quarter-final is at stake, a Playoff will be conducted to determine who goes through.

Round 1

Round 2

Round 3

Round 4

League play-offs

Quarter-Final play-offs

Quarter-Final/Relegation play-off

Knock-Out Stage

Quarter-finals

Semi-finals

Final

Relegation play-offs
The 6 bottom placed teams the league phase will play off against each other. The 3 winners will maintain their senior status for 2018 while the 3 losers will be relegated to the 2018 Intermediate Championship.

References

External links
 Cavan at ClubGAA
 Official Cavan GAA Website

2017 in Gaelic football
Cavan Senior Football Championship
Cavan GAA Football championships